The 2001 Currie Cup Top 8 series was the top tier of the final stage of the 63rd season of the Currie Cup, South Africa's premier domestic rugby union competition, since it started in 1889. The competition was known as the Bankfin Currie Cup for sponsorship reasons and this stage was contested from 20 September to 25 September 2001.

Competition rules and information

There were eight participating teams in the 2001 Currie Cup Top 8 stage. These teams qualified from a qualification series by finishing in the top four teams in one of two sections. The points accumulated against the three other teams that qualified were carried forward to the Top 8 stage. In the Top 8 stage, teams played the four teams from the opposite qualification section once, either at home or away.

Teams received four points for a win and two points for a draw. Bonus points were awarded to teams that scored four or more tries in a game, as well as to teams that lost a match by seven points or less. Teams were ranked by log points, then points difference (points scored less points conceded). The top four teams qualified for the semi-finals.

Teams

Log
The final log of the 2001 Currie Cup Top 8 series:

Matches

The following matches were played in the 2001 Currie Cup Top 8:

Round One

Round Two

Round Three

Round Four

Semi-finals

Final

References

Top 8